is a Japanese actress. She is affiliated with Come True Co., Ltd.

Biography
At the age of 12, Keiko Oginome joined the theater company Himawari. She made her acting debut in the 1977 film Gokumontō. In 1979, she played the role of Helen Keller in the Japanese-language production of the stage play The Miracle Worker. She then became the host of the NHK variety show You and starred in the 1983 film Antarctica.

In 1992, Oginome starred in the film The Triple Cross, which earned her the Best Supporting Actress award at the 14th Yokohama Film Festival (shared with Misa Shimizu). She also released the nude photo book Surrender, which was photographed by film director Yoshitaka Kawai before his suicide in 1990.

In 2019, Oginome transferred from From First Production to Come True Co., Ltd.

Personal life
Yōko Oginome is her younger sister.

In 1985, Oginome had an affair with film director Yoshitaka Kawai, who was married at the time. Kawai was found dead in Oginome's apartment on April 30, 1990, having hanged himself after Oginome allegedly wanted to end their relationship. A year after Kawai's death, Oginome had an affair with The Triple Cross director Kinji Fukusaku, who was 34 years her senior. Their relationship lasted 10 years to his death from prostate cancer in 2003.

On December 31, 2012, Oginome married a man two years her senior.

Filmography

Film
 Gokumontō (1977)
 Kaijōon (1980), Iyo Unoshima
 Antarctica (1983), Asako Shimura
 Bakayarō! 2 Shiawaseninaritai. Episode 3: "Atarashisa ni Tsuiteikenai" (1989), Murako Takahashi
 Ultra Q the Movie: Legend of the Stars (1990), Yuriko Edogawa
 Kagerō (1991), Koyoshi
 The Triple Cross (1992), Mai
 Kōkō Kyōshi (1993), Miwa Sakaki
 Crest of Betrayal (1994), Oume
 Ramro (1994) (uncredited)
 Minazuki (1999), Sayako
 Noroime (2000), Marie Sekikawa
 By Player (2000), Kimie
 Kanzen naru Shiiku: Onna Rihatsushi no Koi (2004), Harumi Imai
 Veronica wa Shinu Koto ni Shita (2006), Lady
 Yūheisha Terrorist (2007), Elder Sister
 Jirochō Sango Kushi (2008), Okoma
 Yoroi Samurai Zombie (2009), Yasuko
 Yamagata Scream (2009), Tsuruko
 Tsuya no Yoru aru ai ni Kakawatta, Onnatachi no Monogatari (2013), Aiko Tenma

Television
 Musashibō Benkei (1986), Tamamushi
 Yako no Kaidan (2009), Minako Murase

References

External links
 Official profile at Come True Co., Ltd.
 Official profile at From First Production
 

1964 births
Living people
Japanese actresses
Actors from Saitama Prefecture